James Doty may refer to:

 James Duane Doty (1799–1865), 19th-century American politician
 James Doty (physician) (born 1955), professor of neurosurgery at Stanford University